A lens space is an example of a topological space, considered in mathematics.  The term often refers to a specific class of 3-manifolds, but in general can be defined for higher dimensions.

In the 3-manifold case, a lens space can be visualized as the result of gluing two solid tori together by a homeomorphism of their boundaries.

The three-dimensional lens spaces  were introduced by Heinrich Tietze in 1908. They were the first known examples of 3-manifolds which were not determined by their homology and fundamental group alone, and the simplest examples of closed manifolds whose homeomorphism type is not determined by their homotopy type.

There is a complete classification of three-dimensional lens spaces, by fundamental group and Reidemeister torsion.

Definition 

Then the -action on  generated by the homeomorphism

is free.  The resulting quotient space is called the lens space .

In three dimensions we have

Properties

(Locally symmetric spaces are symmetric spaces that are quotiented by an isometry that has no fixed points; lens spaces meet this definition.)

Alternative definitions of three-dimensional lens spaces 
The resulting space is homeomorphic to the lens space .

Another related definition is to view the solid ball as the following solid bipyramid: construct a planar regular p sided polygon. Put two points n and s directly above and below the center of the polygon. Construct the bipyramid by joining each point of the regular p sided polygon to n and s. Fill in the bipyramid to make it solid and give the triangles on the boundary the same identification as above.

Classification of 3-dimensional lens spaces 

Classifications up to homeomorphism and homotopy equivalence are known, as follows. The three-dimensional spaces  and
 are:
homeomorphic if and only if .
In this case they are "obviously" homeomorphic, as one can easily produce a homeomorphism. It is harder to show that these are the only homeomorphic lens spaces.

The invariant that gives the homotopy classification of 3-dimensional lens spaces is the torsion linking form.

The homeomorphism classification is more subtle, and is given by Reidemeister torsion. In modern terms, lens spaces are determined by simple homotopy type, and there are no normal invariants (like characteristic classes) or surgery obstruction.

A knot-theoretic classification is given in :
let C be a closed curve in the lens space which lifts to a knot in the universal cover of the lens space.  If the lifted knot has a trivial Alexander polynomial, compute the torsion linking form on the pair (C,C) – then this gives the homeomorphism classification.

Another invariant is the homotopy type of the configuration spaces –  showed that homotopy equivalent but not homeomorphic lens spaces may have configuration spaces with different homotopy types, which can be detected by different Massey products.

See also 

 Spherical 3-manifold

References 

 Glen Bredon, Topology and Geometry, Springer Graduate Texts in Mathematics 139, 1993.
 
 Allen Hatcher, Algebraic Topology, Cambridge University Press, 2002.
 Allen Hatcher, Notes on basic 3-manifold topology. (Explains classification of L(p,q) up to homeomorphism.)
 

 
 Herbert Seifert and William Threlfall, A textbook of topology,  Pure and Applied Mathematics 89,  Translated from the German edition of 1934, Academic Press Inc. New York (1980)		
 Heinrich Tietze, Ueber die topologischen Invarianten mehrdimensionaler Mannigfaltigkeiten, Monatsh. fuer Math. und Phys. 19, 1–118 (1908) (20) English translation (2008) by John Stillwell.
 Matthew Watkins, "A Short Survey of Lens Spaces" (1990 undergraduate dissertation)

External links 
Lens spaces at the Manifold Atlas
Lens spaces: a history at the Manifold Atlas
Fake lens spaces at the Manifold Atlas
3-manifolds
Manifolds